The Squaw Man is a 1918 American silent Western film directed by Cecil B. DeMille. It is a remake of DeMille's 1914 film of the same name, which is based upon a 1905 play by Edwin Milton Royle. The film was reportedly made as an experiment to prove DeMille's theory that a good film is based on a good story. It cost $40,000 to make and grossed $350,000. It would be remade again by DeMille in 1931. The 1918 The Squaw Man is a lost film with only the last reel extant.

Plot
As described in a film magazine, Jim Wynnegate (Dexter), a young Englishman, assumes the guilt for the embezzlement of trust funds that were lost in speculation by his cousin Henry (Hall). He embarks to the United States and settles in the west, where he buys a ranch. In a quarrel with Cash Hawkins (Holt), Jim is saved from death by Naturich (Little), a young Indian woman, who shoots the outlaw. He marries her out of gratitude and becomes known as the squaw man. Soon a son is born, and five years pass. His cousin Henry dies and Jim is summoned back to England to assume the title Earl of Kerhill, he having been exonerated by the deathbed confession of his cousin. He decides to send his son home to England, and the parting between the mother and son are most pathetic. Naturich, about to be arrested for the killing of Hawkins, commits suicide while huddled among her child's playthings.

Cast

 Elliott Dexter as Jim Wynnegate
 Ann Little as Naturich
 Katherine MacDonald as Diana, Henry's Wife
 Theodore Roberts as Big Bill
 Jack Holt as Cash Hawkins
 Thurston Hall as Henry, Jim's Cousin
 Tully Marshall as Sir John Applegate
 Herbert Standing as Dean Of Trentham
 Edwin Stevens as Bud Hardy
 Helen Dunbar as Dowager Countess
 Winter Hall as Fletcher
 Julia Faye as Lady Mabel
 Noah Beery as Tabywana
 Pat Moore as Little Hal
 Jim Mason as Grouchy (credited as James Mason)
 Monte Blue as Happy
 William Brunton as Shorty
 Charles Ogle as Bull Cowan
 Guy Oliver as Kid Clarke
 Clarence Geldart as Solicitor

Reception
Like many American films of the time, The Squaw Man was subject to restrictions and cuts by city and state film censorship boards. For example, the Chicago Board of Censors required a cut, in Reel 4, of the intertitle "By God, you've got to make her happy", the shooting of Cash Hawkins, the shooting of the man in an ambush, and the modification of the plot by the transposition of the scenes of baby moccasins, etc., to indicate that the marriage had taken place prior to when any intimacy between Naturich and Jim Wynnegate had taken place, which would include placing the intertitle "Send for the Justice of the Peace" before the moccasin scene.

See also
 The House That Shadows Built (1931 promotional film by Paramount)

References

External links

 
 
 
 

1918 films
1918 lost films
1918 Western (genre) films
American black-and-white films
Remakes of American films
American films based on plays
Films directed by Cecil B. DeMille
Films set in England
Lost Western (genre) films
Lost American films
Silent American Western (genre) films
1910s American films
1910s English-language films